James Courtney Jeffries (May 18, 1893 – November 28, 1938) was an American pitcher and outfielder in Negro league baseball and the pre-Negro leagues. He was a southpaw pitcher and batter and played almost exclusively for the Indianapolis ABCs.

Jeffries died at the age of 45 in Pulaski, Tennessee.

References

External links
 and Baseball-Reference Black Baseball stats and Seamheads

1893 births
1938 deaths
Baseball outfielders
Baseball pitchers
Baseball players from Louisville, Kentucky
Baltimore Black Sox players
Birmingham Black Barons players
Harrisburg Giants players
Indianapolis ABCs players
20th-century African-American sportspeople